Yangbo Station is a closed railway station on the Gyeongjeon Line in South Korea.

Railway stations in South Gyeongsang Province